The 1988 North Dakota gubernatorial election took place on November 8, 1988 to elect the Governor of North Dakota. Incumbent Democratic Governor George A. Sinner was re-elected to a second term with 58% of the vote, defeating Republican nominee Leon Mallberg, a businessman and "anti-tax crusader" and his running mate Donna Nalewaja. Lloyd Omdahl, who had been appointed Lieutenant Governor of North Dakota in 1987 after the death of Ruth Meiers, was elected on the ticket. , this was the last time a Democrat was elected Governor of North Dakota.

See also
United States gubernatorial elections, 1988

References

External links
 1988 gubernatorial debate

Gubernatorial
1988
North Dakota